Esthlogena proletaria is a species of beetle in the family Cerambycidae. It was described by James Thomson in 1868. It is known from Peru and Venezuela.

References

Pteropliini
Beetles described in 1868